Han Ji-won (born 9 April 1994) is a South Korean footballer who plays for Changwon City FC.

References

1994 births
Living people
South Korean footballers
Association football midfielders
K League 1 players
K League 2 players
Jeonnam Dragons players
Ansan Greeners FC players